Samuel Gómez (born 6 August 1996) is an American soccer player who plays as a midfielder for Real España in the Liga Nacional de Fútbol de Honduras.

Career

Before the 2021 season, Gómez signed for Honduran side Real España.

References

External links
 
 

American expatriate soccer players
American expatriates in Honduras
American people of Honduran descent
Liga Nacional de Fútbol Profesional de Honduras players
Real C.D. España players
American soccer players
Living people
Association football midfielders
1996 births
Expatriate footballers in Honduras
People from Bremerton, Washington